Streptolydigin (Stl) is an antibiotic that works by inhibiting nucleic acid chain elongation by binding to RNA polymerase, thus inhibiting RNA synthesis inside a cell. Streptolydigin inhibits bacterial RNA polymerase, but not eukaryotic RNA polymerase. It has antibacterial activity against a number of Gram positive bacteria.

References 

Antibiotics
Spiro compounds
Pyrrolidones
Propionamides